The 2021–22 Texas Southern Tigers basketball team represented Texas Southern University during the 2021–22 NCAA Division I men's basketball season. The Tigers are led by fourth-year head coach Johnny Jones and played their home games at the Health and Physical Education Arena in Houston, Texas, as members of the West Division of the Southwestern Athletic Conference (SWAC). They finished the season 19–13, 13–5 in SWAC play to finish in second place. As the No. 2 seed, they defeated Jackson State, Grambling State, and Alcorn State to win the SWAC tournament. They received the conference’s automatic bid to the NCAA tournament as the No. 16 seed in the Midwest Region, where they defeated Texas A&M-Corpus Christi in the First Four before losing in the first round to eventual national champion Kansas.

Previous season 
In a season limited due to the ongoing COVID-19 pandemic, the Tigers finished the 2020–21 season 17–9 overall, 10–3 in SWAC play, to finish third place in the conference. The Tigers defeated Alcorn State, Jackson State, and Prairie View A&M to win the SWAC tournament, their ninth SWAC championship. As a result, the Tigers received the conference's automatic bid to the NCAA tournament as the No. 16 seed in the East region. There they lost to No. 1-seeded Michigan in the first round.

Offseason

Departures

Incoming transfers

Recruiting class

Roster

Schedule and results

|-
!colspan=12 style=| Exhibition

|-
!colspan=9 style=| Non-conference regular season

|-
!colspan=9 style=| SWAC regular season

|-
!colspan=12 style=| SWAC tournament
|-

|-
!colspan=12 style=|NCAA tournament

Source

References

Texas Southern Tigers basketball seasons
Texas Southern
Texas Southern Tigers basketball
Texas Southern Tigers basketball
Texas Southern